Gabor Maté  (born January 6, 1944) is a Canadian physician and author. He has a background in family practice and a special interest in childhood development, trauma and potential lifelong impacts on physical and mental health including autoimmune disease, cancer, attention deficit hyperactivity disorder (ADHD), addictions and a wide range of other conditions.

Maté's approach to addiction focuses on the trauma his patients have suffered and looks to address this in their recovery. In his book In the Realm of Hungry Ghosts: Close Encounters with Addiction, Maté discusses the types of trauma suffered by persons with substance use disorders and how this affects their decision making in later life.

He has authored five books exploring topics including ADHD, stress, developmental psychology, and addiction. He is a regular columnist for the Vancouver Sun and The Globe and Mail.

Life and career 
Maté was born in Budapest, Hungary, in 1944. His maternal grandparents were killed in Auschwitz when he was five months old. His aunt disappeared during the war, and his father endured forced labour at the hands of the Nazi Party. When he was 1, Maté's mother put him in the care of a stranger for over 5 weeks in order to save his life. Upon their reunion, the infant Maté was so hurt that he avoided looking at his mother for several days. He claims this trauma of "abandonment, rage, and despair" continues to manifest in his adult life, leading to similar altercations when he perceives a threat of abandonment, especially from his wife.

In 1956, Maté emigrated to Canada. He was a student during the Vietnam War era in the late 1960s and graduated with a B.A. from the University of British Columbia in Vancouver.

In 1969, Maté married artist and fellow UBC graduate Rae Maté; together they have three children including writer and journalist Aaron Maté.

After working as a high school English and literature teacher for several years, he returned to the University of British Columbia to obtain his M.D. in general family practice in 1977.

Maté ran a private family practice in East Vancouver for over 20 years. He was the medical coordinator of the Palliative Care Unit at Vancouver Hospital for seven years. For 12 years, he was the staff physician at Portland Hotel, a residence and resource centre located in downtown Vancouver. Many of his patients had co-occurring mental health and substance use concerns, in addition to chronic health concerns, such as HIV. He worked in harm reduction clinics in Vancouver's Downtown Eastside. He has written about his experiences working with persons with substance use disorders in In the Realm of Hungry Ghosts.

Maté made national headlines in defence of the physicians working at Insite (a legal supervised safe injection site) after the federal Minister of Health, Tony Clement, attacked them as unethical.

In 2010, Maté became interested in the traditional Amazonian plant medicine ayahuasca and its potential for treating addictions. He partnered with a Peruvian Shipibo ayahuasquero (traditional shamanic healer) and began leading multi-day retreats for addiction treatment, including ones in a Coast Salish First Nations community that were the subject of an observational study by health researchers from the University of Victoria and the University of British Columbia. Although preliminary and limited by the observational study design, the research results showed that participants had significant improvements in some psychological measures and reductions in problematic substance use, suggesting that Maté's claims of therapeutic efficacy may be well-founded.  However, when the Canadian federal government learned about Maté's work with ayahuasca in 2011, Health Canada threatened to refer the matter to the RCMP if he did not immediately stop his activities with an illegal drug.

Writings and views 
In his books and lectures, Maté emphasizes the role of biopsychosocial aspects of pathology, and the role of psychological trauma and stress. He underlines the importance of relations and social attachment for learning and for health. His ideas are consistent with a trauma-informed care framework.

Maté defines addiction as any behaviour or substance that a person uses to relieve pain in the short term, but which leads to negative consequences in the long term. Without addressing the root cause of the pain, a person may try to stop but will ultimately crave further relief and be prone to relapse. By this definition there are many things in modern culture that have the potential to become addictive such as gambling, sex, food, work, social media, and drugs. He argues the "war on drugs" actually punishes people for having been abused and entrenches addiction more deeply, as studies show that stress is the biggest driver of addictive relapse and behaviour. He says a system that marginalizes, ostracizes, and institutionalizes people in facilities with no care and easy access to drugs, only worsens the problem.

Awards 
He has received the Hubert Evans Prize for Literary Non-Fiction.

In 2011, Maté received the Civic Merit Award of the City of Vancouver "for his extensive work on addiction treatment and his contributions to understanding mental health and youth related to addiction, stress and childhood development".

On May 11, 2018, Maté was awarded his coundry's highest civilian honour, the Order of Canada.

Criticism 

He has been criticised by some for attributing all addictions to early childhood trauma, and for ignoring genetic factors in addiction/ADHD. 

In his high-profile live-streamed interview with Prince Harry in March 2023, Maté diagnosed the prince publicly with PTSD, ADHD, anxiety, and depression based on his conversation with him and reading his autobiography Spare. During the chat, the doctor told the Duke of Sussex that he had diagnosed him with ADD after reading through his book and hearing about his life experiences. His decision to do so was described as unorthodox and reckless by some critics.

Books 
The Myth of Normal: Trauma, Illness and Healing in a Toxic Culture, Co-authored with Daniel Maté, Toronto, Canada, A.A. Knopf Canada, 2022 
Scattered Minds: A New Look at the Origins and Healing of Attention Deficit Disorder. Toronto: A.A. Knopf, 1999. .
Scattered: How Attention Deficit Disorder Originates and What You Can Do About It. United States.
When the Body Says No: The Cost of Hidden Stress. Toronto: A.A. Knopf, 2003. .
When the Body Says No: Exploring the Stress-Disease Connection. United States.
Hold on to Your Kids:  Why Parents Need to Matter More Than Peers. Co-authored with Gordon Neufeld. Toronto: A.A. Knopf, 2004. .
In the Realm of Hungry Ghosts: Close Encounters with Addiction. Toronto: A.A. Knopf, 2008. .

Films and videos 

The Power of Connection. Video. Wholehearted, 2020.
A Masterclass for Healers. Video. Wholehearted, 2020.
Healing Trauma & Addiction. Video. Wholehearted, 2020.
Wisdom of Trauma. Film. Science & Nonduality, 2021. By Maurizio and Zaya Benazzo.
Zeitgeist: Moving Forward, 2011. By Peter Joseph.
Joe Rogan Experience #1869, 2022 (2 hr. 24 min. video interview)
Drunk on Too Much Life. Documentary, 2021.
 Why do some people become addicts and not others? Interview. BBC Ideas, 2022.
 This Is Why You Feel LOST & UNHAPPY In Life! (Change Everything) | Gabor Matè Interview/Podcast. Impact Theory, Tom Bilyeu, 2022.
 The Power of Connection & The Myth of Normal Video Special. Wholehearted, 2022.

References

External links 

Video and audio interviews with Maté  and Democracy Now! (some with transcripts)
The Power of Addiction and The Addiction of Power: Gabor Maté at TEDxRio+20
The Power of Connection:  Gabor Maté at Wholehearted.org

The Seductive and Dangerous Allure of Gabor Maté at Psychology Today

1944 births
Canadian addiction physicians
Canadian health activists
Living people
Members of the Order of Canada
Canadian people of Hungarian-Jewish descent
Hungarian general practitioners
Hungarian emigrants to Canada
Writers on addiction